Wilberforce Colony was a colony established in the year 1829 by free African American citizens, north of present-day London, Ontario, Canada. It was an effort by American Blacks to create a place where they could live in political freedom.

When American Black communities favoured emigration (and many did not), they preferred going to a country where free Blacks could hold full political control over their destiny. The establishment of what became the Wilberforce Colony in Canada was one such movement. It was planned by Black Americans from Cincinnati, Ohio who emigrated following passage of discriminatory laws in the year 1828 and a destructive riot against them by White Americans in 1829.

The frontier colony grew quickly upon its founding. Refugee slaves, who had escaped to freedom in Canada, also joined the colony. Internal disputes, lack of funding, and the draw of urban jobs led to its decline by 1850. In the 1840s, many Irish immigrants settled in this area after fleeing famine in their homeland. Altogether, the Wilberforce Colony survived as an independent community fewer than 20 years.

Background 

The increase in Cincinnati's Black population in the decade starting in 1820 was rapid and pronounced. Although Ohio was a free state, the southern portion was influenced by settlers from the south and racial tensions grew. In 1820, some 433 African Americans comprised less than 4% of the city's population, but over the next decade the city's Black population swelled by more than 400%. This change alarmed some White residents. In response to a citizens' petition in 1828, the Cincinnati City Council appointed a committee, "to take measures to prevent the increase of [African] population within the city." In March of that year, the Ohio Supreme Court decided that the 1807 state Black Laws, which placed restrictions on Black people in many areas of life and employment, were constitutional. The Cincinnati City Council enforced this restrictive legislation.

Purchase of land in Canada 
Near the end of June 1828, the Black population of Cincinnati elected Israel Lewis and Thomas Crissup to survey a site in Canada to which they could emigrate. Lewis and Crissup met with John Colbourne, the Lieutenant Governor of Upper Canada, to discuss prospects of settling in the area. They entered into a contract with the Canada Company for the purchase of land in Biddulph in the Huron Tract in Ontario, lots 2, 3, and 5 north of the Proof Line Road and lot 11 south of the road, for the amount of $1.50 per acre. The land was on the Ausable River, some twenty miles (32 km) from Lake Huron, and about thirty-five miles from the northern shore of Lake Erie.

Emigration from Cincinnati 
The Cincinnati riots of 1829 broke out at the start of July and continued to the end of August, as a result of white people attacking Black people. There was an exodus of around 1,000 Black individuals from Cincinnati.

Those who left the city that summer comprised two groups. Those who were primarily forced out of Cincinnati by violence, fear, and inability to work generally settled in nearby towns or villages. The second group organized as an exodus, with many emigrating the full distance of nearly 400 miles to the Canadian site. Since settling in the still-unnamed Wilberforce Colony required purchase of land, however, those without financial resources simply stopped in the United States, settling in towns on the southern shore of Lake Erie where they could find work. They never made it to Canada.

Those who did make it to Canada had to travel some thirty-five miles northward from Lake Erie through untracked forest. At the site, they had to clear land for crops and to build dwellings. Although exact figures are not known, evidence suggests that of the initial exodus, only five or six families made it to the Ontario colony in the first year.

Settlement and naming the colony 
The initial arrangement between the Canada Company and Lewis and Crissup called for a $6,000 payment by November 1830. But the number of colonists expected to support that purchase could not be immediately achieved, and the financial resources of the initial colonists could not support that arrangement. Financial stability for the colony was precarious for that first year.

They appealed to other sources for additional support, with efforts to raise monies in Cincinnati and pleas to the Ohio state legislature made in vain. But an appeal to the Quakers (mostly based in Oberlin, Ohio) was successful. On September 20, 1830, James Brown, former US Minister of France and US Senator from Louisiana, and Stephen Duncan, an extremely wealthy planter and slaveholder from Pennsylvania and Mississippi, purchased  for the settlement.

With the land secured, the colonists turned to clearing land and building structures. In 1831, the settlement was named, "Wilberforce," in honour of William Wilberforce, the prominent British abolitionist. Leading the fight against the British slave trade, he helped gain passage of the 1807 Act that abolished the slave trade throughout the British Empire. (The institution of slavery itself would not be abolished in the British empire until August 1833, effective in 1834.)

Growth of the colony 
The initial group of emigrants tended to be Black individuals from the more educated class of Cincinnati. The education for their children was of great importance. They were building on a tradition formed in Cincinnati, where the community placed great importance on education. The first institution established in Wilberforce was a school. American social reformer William Lloyd Garrison visited the colony in 1831 and noted that 20-30 children attended schools. By 1832, they had established three schools, and their quality attracted students from the surrounding White population. Aspirations for education extended beyond elementary and secondary schools.

The desire of the Wilberforce colonists was for more than mere literacy. Also by 1832, the settlement had crops in the ground and log homes. Settlers built three sawmills: one powered by water, a gristmill, and several general stores. The proximity of the settlement to the Ausable River gave transportation access to goods, and provided a way to export products, both agricultural and forest-related.

The riots in Cincinnati, and the establishment of Wilberforce Colony, helped raise a national Black consciousness. Interest grew in emigration from other northern cities. The Mother Bethel Church in Philadelphia assembled Black leaders from across the north to search for solutions to empower all African Americans. In an 1830 national convention, the assembly organized itself as the American Society of Free Persons of Color (ASFPC), the beginning of the Black convention movement. Impetus began at the first annual convention of the ASFPC, with the proposal to establish a manual labor college for young men in New Haven, Connecticut. When this seemed impossible, the convention turned to Wilberforce. A national subscription campaign in the United States and Great Britain, under the direction of Nathaniel Paul, was attempted. The subscription drive failed, but the importance of higher education to the Wilberforce colonists was clearly demonstrated.

Within the first 18 months, as Wilberforce grew from the initial few families, other Black American emigrants joined them from Boston, Rochester, Albany, New York, Baltimore, and other cities. Subsequent recruiting efforts drew Black people and their families from other northern cities, and by 1832 there were 32 families in the area. By 1835, the community had 166 inhabitants. Eventually about 150-200 families settled there.

With this infusion of African Americans from several cities, political growth began. A board of managers was created, primarily to oversee financial matters. Austin Steward, an abolitionist recently arrived from Rochester, New York, was named president. He and other newcomers replaced the old Cincinnati leaders, in 1831 relegating Israel Lewis, original colony organizer and land agent, to U.S. fundraising agent. He was one of two fundraising agents appointed, the other being Nathaniel Paul in England.

Decline and dissolution 

The schism between the original Cincinnati families and new settlers eventually led to the decline of the colony. The Cincinnati leaders came from city life and did not adapt well to the harsh farming environment. Within that first decade, many of the leaders of the emigration movement who had located in Wilberforce, left the community. In addition, both fundraising agents failed to live up to expectations. By 1839, suspicions of wrongdoing, particularly by Lewis, exacerbated the problems of Wilberforce. According to a historian of the area:

By the late 1840s, the Irish began moving into the area as part of a wave of immigration resulting from widespread famine in Ireland. The Black population declined greatly, with many of the original colonists moving on to larger, growing urban centres such as Detroit, Cleveland, or Toronto to obtain wage-based employment. Eventually, the Irish community supplanted Wilberforce altogether, and the town of Lucan was incorporated. Wilberforce as a free Black colony faded into history.

A small number of Black families stayed on to work the land through subsequent generations. But, by the end of the 20th century, only the family of settler Peter Butler still had descendants in the area of the Wilberforce Colony village.

Chronology 

1828
 June — Cincinnati Black population elects Israel Lewis and Thomas Crissup to survey a site in Canada to which they can emigrate.
 July — Lewis and Crissup met with John Colbourne, Lieutenant Governor of Upper Canada, to discuss prospects of settling in the area. They enter into a contract with the Canada Company for the purchase of land in Biddulph in the Huron Tract in Ontario, lots 2, 3, and 5 north of the Proof Line Road and lot 11 south of the road.

1829
 July–August — Cincinnati riots of 1829 force more than 1,000 African-Americans to leave the city. A group of these set out for the settlement.
 September — First wave of settlers, probably only five or six families, arrive in the area.

1830
 September 20 — James Brown and Stephen Duncan purchased  for the establishment of the colony.

1831
 Settlement named "Wilberforce" in honour of William Wilberforce.
 Emigrants from Boston, Rochester, Albany, New York, Baltimore, and other cities join the settlement.
 William Lloyd Garrison visits the colony, noting that 20-30 children attend schools.
 Board of managers created, with Austin Steward named president.
 Original colony organizer Israel Lewis is appointed as the local fundraising agent; Nathaniel Paul named fundraising agent for Great Britain.

1832
 Wilberforce has 32 families, with crops in the ground and log homes. The colony has three sawmills, a gristmill, and several general stores. 
 Three schools established, drawing students from the surrounding white population.

1835
 Wilberforce population hits 166 inhabitants.

1836
 Lewis accused of mismanaging fundraising accounts.

1840
 Most of the original Cincinnati settlers have left.

1850
 Black population in the area declines in the face of Irish immigration; the colony effectively dissolves.

References

Further reading

 

Black Canadian culture in Ontario
History of racial segregation in the United States
History of Cincinnati
Black Canadian settlements
Populated places established by African Americans
History of African-American civil rights
Settlement schemes in Canada